Holconia insignis is a species of huntsman spider found in Queensland and New South Wales, Australia. It is the type species for the genus Holconia, and was first described by Tamerlan Thorell in 1870.

References

Sparassidae
Spiders of Australia
Spiders described in 1870